Agra aculeata is a species of beetle in the family Carabidae. It is found in Colombia.

References 

Insects described in 1852
Insects of South America
Lebiinae